Farmers' protest or Farmers protest is a protest carried out by farmers.

Individual protests include:
 1989–1990 Dutch farmers' protests, protests in 1989–1990 by farmers in the Netherlands
 2017 Tamil Nadu farmers' protest, protests in 2017 against BJP policies in Tamil Nadu, India
 2020–2021 Indian farmers' protest, mass protests in 2020-2021 by farmers in India
 2021 Indian farmers' Republic Day protest, farmers' protests on 2021 Republic Day in Delhi, India
 Dutch farmers' protests, ongoing protests since 2019 by farmers in the Netherlands